The Canadian Soccer League Golden Boot is an annual Canadian soccer award given to the top goalscorer for each season in the Canadian Soccer League. The Golden Boot has been awarded since 1998 when the league debuted as the Canadian Professional Soccer League. The highest ranked CSL Golden Boot goalscorer is Gus Kouzmanis with 33 goals during the league's inaugural season. Kouzmanis has also won the award the most times (2) during the 1998, and 2000 seasons. Players from twelve countries, other than Canada, have won the Golden Boot including Croatia (Tihomir Maletic, 2010, Dražen Vuković, 2012, Marin Vučemilović-Grgić 2014), Serbia (Aleksandar Stojiljković, 2017, Vladimir Strizovic, 2022), Ukraine (Sergiy Ivliev, 2016, Mykola Temniuk 2019), Trinidad and Tobago (Kevin Nelson, 2001), England (Darren Tilley, 2002), Jamaica (Richard West, 2015), Northern Ireland (Paul Munster, 2004), United States (Aaron Byrd, 2005), Romania (Gabriel Pop, 2006),  France (Guillaume Surot, 2014),  Ghana (Sani Dey, 2018), and Central African Republic (Moussa Limane, 2020) The club with the most top goalscorers is the Toronto/Mississauga Olympians with four wins followed by London City, Scarborough SC, and Trois-Rivières Attak with two.

Winners

Awards won by club

Awards won by nationality

See also
Canadian Soccer League MVP Award

References

Canadian Soccer League (1998–present) awards
Canada Soccer